The 2008 Central Michigan Chippewas football team represented Central Michigan University during the 2008 NCAA Division I FBS football season. Central Michigan competed as a member of the West Division of the Mid-American Conference (MAC). The Chippewas were led by second-year head coach Butch Jones.

Central Michigan finished the regular season with an 8–4 overall record and 6–2 in conference play, which was good enough for second place in the MAC West. The team received a second straight bid to the Motor City Bowl, where they faced the Florida Atlantic Owls led by head coach Howard Schnellenberger. The two teams were tied throughout the third quarter until the Owls pulled away. Central Michigan quarterback Dan LeFevour led a touchdown drive in the final three minutes, but an onside kick attempt failed, and the Chippewas lost, 24–21.

Schedule

References

Central Michigan
Central Michigan Chippewas football seasons
Central Michigan Chippewas football